Events from the year 1867 in China.

Incumbents 
 Tongzhi Emperor (6th year)
 Regent: Empress Dowager Cixi

Events 

 Nian Rebellion
 Battle of Inlon River, Nian forces lose entire Hubei region
 Miao Rebellion (1854–73)
 Dungan Revolt (1862–77)
 Panthay Rebellion
 Rover incident in Taiwan
 Formosa Expedition
 Tongzhi Restoration
 Hakka-Punti Clan Wars end, Hakka were allocated their own independent sub-prefecture, Chixi (赤溪镇), which was carved out of south-eastern Taishan, while others were relocated to Guangxi Province, mass emigration

Births 

 Jiang Shufang, Chinese school pioneer

Deaths 
 Zhang Shusheng killed in battle against Taiping Rebellion loyalists
 Ren Zhu, Nian general killed in battle again Qing forces

References